Wrestling bouts are described in some of the world's mythologies.

The Epic of Gilgamesh in Sumerian literature features its hero Gilgamesh establishing his credibility as a leader after wrestling Enkidu. Other sculptures and literature from ancient Mesopotamia show that wrestling was a popular activity.
The Iliad describes Aias and Odysseus wrestling against each other.
Another early description of wrestling appears in the  Hebrew Book of Genesis (32:22-32). The passage depicts the patriarch Jacob wrestling with the Angel, for which Jacob was subsequently renamed Israel. (Israel translates to "wrestles (or strives) with God".)
The Sanskrit epic Mahabharata describes the encounter between the accomplished wrestlers Bhima and Jarasandha; "grasping each other in various ways by means of their arms, and kicking each other with such violence as to affect the innermost nerves, they struck at each other's breasts with clenched fists. With bare arms as their only weapons roaring like clouds they grasped and struck each other like two mad elephants encountering each other with their trunks".
Thor wrestled against Elli.

Notes

References

Wrestling
Mythology